The Historic Chapels Trust is a British Registered Charity set up to care for redundant non-Anglican churches, chapels, and places of worship in England.  To date, its holdings encompass various nonconformist Christian denominations and Roman Catholic sites.

Foundation
Established in 1993, the Trust takes into ownership buildings of exceptional architectural and historic significance that are no longer used by their congregations. In practice this means buildings listed Grade I or II* by English Heritage.  It was founded in response to the large number of places of worship that were being demolished or destroyed by insensitive conversion and it remains the only body with this mission in England.

Activities
Once acquired, the buildings are repaired and restored, and then available for new, mostly secular, community uses.   The places of worship can be of any denomination or faith, other than the Anglican Church.  To date they have included Nonconformist chapels of the Methodist, Unitarian, Baptist, Lutheran denominations, two Congregationalist chapels, two Quaker meeting houses and four Roman Catholic churches. The Trust has the power to take synagogues and non-Christian places of worship but in spite of negotiations has not yet done so. The Trust arranges for the chapels to be open to the public at advertised times, and wherever possible it introduces disabled access.  Its policy is that the chapels should be used for community activities, including concerts, lectures, conferences, exhibitions, and any other activity compatible with conservation of the building.  The Trust also encourages the use of the buildings for services of worship.

At about half of its sites the Trust has formed a volunteer local committee to organise events, arrange occasional services of worship. At others it engages volunteers as key-holders and to assist with the maintenance of sites.  Whenever possible and appropriate, the Trust installs modern heating and lighting, kitchens and toilets. In 2012 the Trust declared a moratorium on rescuing new sites unless they are donated together with endowment funds, a policy it will review if finances allow.

Executive Directors of the Trust were Dr.Jenny Freeman 1993 – 2011. On her retirement Dr Freeman was awarded an OBE for her services to heritage. Roland Jeffery held the post of Director 2013–2018.

Finances
The Trust has no endowment and receives no direct government grant. Its resources are won from English Heritage, the Heritage Lottery Fund, money earned by events at the buildings, grants from trusts and foundations, legacies from Supporters and donations from individuals and Patrons.  This is in contrast with the larger Churches Conservation Trust, which received 70 percent of its funding from the Department for Culture, Media and Sport, and the Church of England but which can only take into care Anglican buildings.

Governance
The Trust is a secular UK registered charity and operates only in England. Since 2015 the President of the Trust is the Rt Hon Lord Beith. In 2018 the charity announced that because of the uncertainty of future funding the Trust's office would close with immediate effect and its work would be managed on its behalf by the Churches Conservation Trust, an Anglican not for profit organisation.

Rescued places of worship
In spite of its meagre resources the Trust has to date rescued 20 properties.   Some have been semi-derelict buildings, such as the Dissenters' Chapel in Kensal Green Cemetery, and Salem Chapel in East Budleigh, Devon.  Some chapels are in remote locations, such as Biddlestone Chapel in Northumberland, Farfield Friends Meeting House in West Yorkshire, and Penrose Methodist Chapel in Cornwall.  Others are in urban areas, such as Wallasey Memorial Unitarian Church in Merseyside, and St George's German Lutheran Church in London.  Some are small and simple, large and elaborate buildings, such as the Bethesda Methodist Chapel in Hanley, Staffordshire, Todmorden Unitarian Church in West Yorkshire, Umberslade Baptist Church in the West Midlands, and the Shrine of Our Lady of Lourdes in Blackpool, Lancashire.  During the first 13 years of its existence, the Trust won ten architectural awards, including a Europa Nostra Award for the Dissenters' Chapel.

Key

See also
Churches Conservation Trust, the equivalent body for redundant Anglican churches
Friends of Friendless Churches, a non-denominational charity, which rescues and repairs redundant places of worship in England and Wales

Notes
This is the date of first construction of the existing building.

References

External links
Historic Chapels Trust official site

Charities based in London
Heritage organisations in England
Conservation in England

1993 establishments in England
Organizations established in 1993
Building Preservation Trusts